Gerolamo Borgia (1475–1550) was a Roman Catholic prelate who served as Bishop of Massa Lubrense (1544–1550).

Biography
Gerolamo Borgia was born in Senise, Italy in 1475. In 1544, he was appointed during the papacy of Pope Leo X as Bishop of Massa Lubrense.
He served as Bishop of Massa Lubrense until his death in 1550.

See also 
Catholic Church in Italy

References

External links and additional sources
 (for Chronology of Bishops) 
 (for Chronology of Bishops) 

1475 births
1550 deaths
16th-century Italian Roman Catholic bishops
Bishops appointed by Pope Leo X